Podgornya is a rural locality (a village) in Plesetsky District, Arkhangelsk Oblast, Russia. The population was 4 as of 2012.

Geography 
Podgornya is located 100 km east of Plesetsk (the district's administrative centre) by road. Barkhatikha is the nearest rural locality.

References 

Rural localities in Plesetsky District